Gregorio San Miguel Angulo (Valmaseda, December 2, 1940) is a former Spanish road racing cyclist.

Major achievements 

1966
Vuelta a España
1st, Stage 14
1st, Gran Premio de la Montaña
1967
1st, Stage 3, Volta a Catalunya
1968
1st, Bordeaux-Saintes
1st, Stage 4, Tour de Suisse
1st, Gran Premio de Villafranca
1st, Prix de Maurs
1st, Campeonato de España de Montaña
4th, Tour de France
1969
1st, Gran Premio Navarra
1st, Stage 17, Vuelta a España

External links
 Palmarès by urtekaria.com 

1940 births
Living people
Spanish male cyclists
People from Enkarterri
Tour de Suisse stage winners
Sportspeople from Biscay
Cyclists from the Basque Country (autonomous community)